Hajjiabad-e Hajj Ali Mohammad (also Romanized as Ḩājjīābād-e Ḩājj ʿAlī Moḩammad; also known as Ḩājjīābād) is a village in Chahdegal Rural District, Negin Kavir District, Fahraj County, Kerman Province, Iran. At the 2006 census, its population was 243, in 64 families.

References 

Populated places in Fahraj County